Tout chante autour de moi is a 1954 black and white French musical comedy film directed by Pierre Gout which was the debut film vehicle for the pop star Mouloudji.

Cast
 Marcel Mouloudji : Georges
 Alain Bouvette
 Christine Carère : Anne-Marie
 Florence Fouquet : Marthe Nollier
 Pierre Mondy : Paul Nollier
 Michel Piccoli : Reverdier
 Lucien Raimbourg

Soundtrack 
The soundtrack includes "Je ne sais pas pourquoi", by Mouloudji and also recorded by Mathé Altéry and other French singers. The track appears on Mouloudji: les plus belles javas and Mouloudji: 58 grandes chansons.

References

1954 films
1954 musical comedy films
French musical comedy films
1950s French-language films
French black-and-white films
1950s French films